Parrott is a census-designated place (CDP) in Pulaski County, Virginia, United States. The population as of the United States Census, 2017 was 509

The town was named after John Henry Parrott Jr.(1847-1930). Parrott started the Pulaski Anthracite coal mine in 1902 and was the mine's general manager and probable shareholder.

Parrott is bordered by the New River which is the oldest river system on the North American continent and second only to the Nile River in Africa as the oldest river in the world.  It flows northward rather than southward like most of the other major rivers along the eastern seaboard.

References

Unincorporated communities in Virginia
Census-designated places in Pulaski County, Virginia
Coal towns in Virginia
Census-designated places in Virginia